Zlatar is a mountain range in southwestern Serbia, lying between towns of Prijepolje and Nova Varoš. Its highest peak is Velika krseva, 1,627 meters tall, peak next to Golo brdo. It belongs to Stari Vlah group of Dinaric Alps. Zlatar is bounded by rivers Uvac, Lim, Mileševka and Bistrica, and has a total of four artificial lakes – Zlatar Lake, Radoinjsko Lake, Uvac Lake and Potpeć. Mountainous climate with significant mediterranean influence, dense pine forests, and a high number of sunny days, is suitable for medicinal purposes and altitude training. At the elevation of 1,237 meters, there is a Special Rehabilitation Hospital "Zlatar" with 330 beds.

References

External links
 Tourist and sports centre Zlatar
 Special Rehabilitation Hospital "ZLATAR"
 Zlatarinfo - Lates News from Zlatar and Nova Varos
 Ski resort Zlatar

Mountains of Serbia